Furcifer tuzetae is a species of chameleon that is endemic to Madagascar. It is only known from its type locality, Andrenalamivola near Befandriana Sud. It was described by Édouard-Raoul Brygoo, Robert M. Bourgat and Charles Antoine Domergue in 1972. The International Union for Conservation of Nature have rated this species as "data deficient".

Etymology
The specific name, tuzetae, is in honor of French parasitologist Odette Tuzet (1906–1976).

Distribution and habitat
Furcifer tuzetae is found in Madagascar. Its type locality is Andrenalamivola (Befandriana Sud). Furcifer tuzetae is known from an area of dry forest; it might occur in gallery forests. Only a single specimen of the species has been collected in Andrenalamivola, although it may be found elsewhere in Befandriana Sud, where there is a large area of suitable habitat.

Reproduction
Furcifer tuzetae is oviparous.

Conservation status
The species F. tuzetae was rated as "data deficient" by the International Union for Conservation of Nature (IUCN) as not enough data have been collected. It is likely that the population of the species is declining because it has only been found once, despite multiple surveys being carried out to find the species. It may be affected by the slash-and-burn method of agriculture and logging for charcoal.

Taxonomy
Furcifer tuzetae was described initially by Brygoo, Bourgat and Domergue in 1972 under the name Chamaeleo tutzetae. It became known as Furcifer tuzetae when Glaw and Vences transferred it to the genus Furcifer in 1994.

References

Further reading
Brygoo ER, Bourgat RM, Domergue CA (1972). "Notes sur les Chamaeleo de Madagascar, C. tuzetae n. sp., nouvelle espèce du Sud-Ouest ". Bulletin du Muséum d'Histoire Naturelle, Paris, Series 3, 27 (21): 133-146. (Chamaeleo tuzetae, new species). (in French).
Glaw F, Vences M (1994). A Fieldguide to the Amphibians and Reptiles of Madagascar, Second Edition. Cologne, Germany: Vences & Glaw Verlag / Serpents Tale. 480 pp. . (Furcifer tuzetae, new combination, p. 253).
Glaw F, Vences M (2006). A Field Guide to the Amphibians and Reptiles of Madagascar, Third Edition. Cologne, Germany: Vences & Glaw Verlag. 496 pp. .
Nečas P (1999). Chameleons: Nature's hidden jewels. Frankfurt am Main, Germany: Edition Chimaira. 348 pp.  (Europe),  (USA, Canada). (Furcifer tuzetae, p. 283).

Furcifer
Endemic fauna of Madagascar
Reptiles of Madagascar
Reptiles described in 1972
Taxa named by Édouard-Raoul Brygoo
Taxa named by Charles Domergue